Cancer Epidemiology (formerly known as Cancer Detection & Prevention) is a peer reviewed journal devoted to epidemiological cancer research. According to the Journal Citation Reports, the journal has a 2020 impact factor of 2.984.

Editor-in-Chief
Eve Roman (University of York)

References

Epidemiology journals
Elsevier academic journals
Oncology journals
Bimonthly journals